Ameer Minai or Amir Meenai (1829 — 13 October 1900) was a 19th-century Indian poet. He was respected by several contemporary poets including Ghalib and Daagh Dehalvi and by Muhammad Iqbal. He wrote in Urdu, Persian and Arabic.

Early life
The Minai family had lived in Lucknow for centuries in the area around Shah Mina's tomb, known as "Mina Bazaar" or "Mohalla-e Minaian" (The Quarter of the Minais). Ameer was educated at Farangi Mahal, Lucknow's primary educational institute.

Work
In the British attack on Lucknow in 1856 and the subsequent First war of independence in 1857, the family's homes were all destroyed and Meenai was forced to flee with his family, first to the nearby town of Kakori where he found refuge with the poet Mohsin Kakorvi, and eventually to the state of Rampur, where he found favor at the court of the ruler, Nawab of Rampur Yusef Ali Khan Bahadur.

He served in the judiciary, was appointed head of Rampur's magnificent library, and became the official poetic mentor (ustad) of the ruler, succeeding the great Urdu poet, Ghalib, in this position. Meenai lived in Rampur until 1900 when he decided to go to Hyderabad Deccan to seek financial support for the publication of his Urdu dictionary, "Ameer-ul-Lughaat" – but that was not to be, and he died there on 13 October 1900, barely a month after his arrival. He is buried in Hyderabad, India.

Poetry

In poetry, Meenai is best known for his ghazals, and for the na`at genre—poems in praise of the Prophet Muhammad, which he helped popularize in Urdu poetry.

Legacy

Mutaala'-e Ameer by Abu Muhammad Sahar, published in Lucknow in 1963, analyses Meenai's life and literary work.

Popular naat poetry
Meenai was considered a pioneer of naat poetry.
, Sung by Nusrat Fateh Ali Khan, naat lyrics by Amir Meenai
 Naat qawwali by Amir Meenai, sung by Qawwal Bahauddin Khan
 Naat lyrics by Amir Meenai, sung by Umme Habiba
 Naat qawwali written by Amir Meenai, sung by Nusrat Fateh Ali Khan

Popular ghazal songs
 '' Lyrics by Amir Meenai, sung and popularised by ghazal maestro Jagjit Singh and later also featured in a film starring Rishi Kapoor and Tina Munim.
'', sung by K.L. Saigal, Ghulam Ali, M. Kalim and others
'', sung by Ustad Barkat Ali Khan
'', sung by Farida Khanum
 , sung by Kavita Seth in A Suitable Boy

Bibliography
Amir Meenai wrote over 40 books in his lifetime, some of which are unpublished.
 Subah-e-Azal
 Shaam-e-Awadh
 Divan-e-Farsi (Persian poetry), edited by Tehseen Firaqi, published in 2016
 Miraat-ul-ghaib
 Sanam khana-i-ishq
 Khayaban-i-Aafrinish (Prophet Muhammad's life in easy prose)

References

External links

Poetry of Amir Meenai on YouTube

Urdu-language poets from India
1829 births
1900 deaths
19th-century Indian Muslims
Writers from Lucknow
Muslim poets
19th-century Indian poets
Poets from Uttar Pradesh
Urdu-language writers
Linguists from India